Reza Mahalleh (also Romanized as Reẕā Maḩalleh; also known as Reẕā Maḩalleh-ye Bālā) is a village in Goli Jan Rural District, in the Central District of Tonekabon County, Mazandaran Province, Iran. At the 2006 census, its population was 179, in 54 families.

References 

Populated places in Tonekabon County